Cabra is a stop on the Luas light-rail tram system in Dublin, Ireland.  It opened in 2017 as a stop on Luas Cross City, an extension of the Green Line through the city centre from St. Stephen's Green to Broombridge.

The stop provides access to the neighbourhood of Cabra and the National Botanic Gardens.

Location
Cabra Luas stop is located at the northern end of the Broadstone railway cutting, immediately to the north of Connaught Street, which crosses the line on the Liam Whelan bridge, which was rebuilt as part of the construction of the stop.  The main entrance is a long ramp leading from the eastern side of the bridge to the middle of the southbound platform (there are also stairs which lead from the middle of the ramp to the end of the platform).  A second entrance consists of a pathway leading from the northern end of the stop to the nearby Mount Bernard Park.

The cutting is somewhat wider than the stop itself, meaning that there is some leftover space behind the northbound platform.  Saplings have been planted in this area in an attempt to reduce the Luas's carbon footprint.  Saplings have also been planted on the southbound platform.

References

Luas Green Line stops in Dublin (city)
Railway stations opened in 2017
2017 establishments in Ireland
Railway stations in the Republic of Ireland opened in the 21st century